The 1847 New Jersey gubernatorial election was held on November 2, 1847. Democratic nominee Daniel Haines defeated Whig nominee William Wright with 51.88% of the vote.

General election

Candidates
Daniel Haines, former Governor (1843–45) (Democratic)
William Wright, former U.S. Representative and Mayor of Newark (Whig)

Results

References

1847
New Jersey
1847 New Jersey elections
November 1847 events